
Eugenia "Genia" Leskiw (née Jereniuk; 1950) is a Canadian politician, who was elected in the 2008 provincial election to represent the electoral district of Bonnyville-Cold Lake in the Legislative Assembly of Alberta, the first woman and the first Ukrainian-Canadian to represent the area. She was a member of the Progressive Conservative caucus and sat on several committees, including Privileges and Elections, the Standing Orders and Printing Committee, and the Special Standing Committee on Members Services.

Electoral history

References

Progressive Conservative Association of Alberta MLAs
Women MLAs in Alberta
Living people
1950 births
21st-century Canadian politicians
21st-century Canadian women politicians
Canadian people of Ukrainian descent